Liu Yuexi (born 10 November 1968) is a Chinese speed skater. She competed in two events at the 1992 Winter Olympics.

References

1968 births
Living people
Chinese female speed skaters
Olympic speed skaters of China
Speed skaters at the 1992 Winter Olympics
Sportspeople from Heilongjiang
Speed skaters at the 1990 Asian Winter Games
Universiade bronze medalists for China
Universiade medalists in speed skating
Competitors at the 1991 Winter Universiade
20th-century Chinese women
21st-century Chinese women